The 2000 Pro Bowl was the NFL's all-star game for the 1999 season. The game was played on February 6, 2000 at Aloha Stadium in Honolulu, Hawaii  Attendance— 50,112. The game was broadcast by ABC with a running time of three hours and sixteen minutes. The final score was NFC 51, AFC 31. The AFC coach was Tom Coughlin of Jacksonville.
The NFC coach was Tony Dungy of Tampa Bay. Randy Moss of the Minnesota Vikings was the game's MVP with 9 catches for 212 yards and one touchdown.

The referee was Tom White.

Scoring summary
The scores broken down by quarter:
1st Quarter
NFC— Aeneas Williams 62-yd interception return ( Jason Hanson kick), 12:14; 7-0 NFC
NFC—Hanson 21-yd FG, 4:24; 10-0 NFC
AFC— Jimmy Smith 5-yd pass from Mark Brunell ( Olindo Mare kick ), 0:30. 10-7 NFC
2nd Quarter 
NFC— Mike Alstott 1-yd run (Hanson kick), 12:57; 17-7 NFC
AFC— Tony Gonzalez 10-yd pass from Rich Gannon (Mare kick), 10:05; 17-14 NFC
NFC—Alstott 3-yd run (Hanson kick), 4:45; 24-14 NFC
AFC—Smith 21-yd pass from Peyton Manning (Mare kick), 0:20; 24-21 NFC
NFC—Hanson 51-yd FG, 0:00. 27-21 NFC
3rd Quarter
NFC—Alstott 1-yd run (Hanson kick), 7:08; 34-21 NFC
NFC—Hanson 23-yd FG, 2:03. 37-21 NFC
4th Quarter
AFC—Mare 33-yd FG, 14:49; 37-24 NFC
NFC— Derrick Brooks 20-yd interception return (Hanson kick), 11:12: 44-24 NFC
AFC—Smith 52-yd pass from Manning (Mare kick), 6:30; 44-31 NFC
NFC— Randy Moss 25-yd pass from Steve Beuerlein (Hanson kick), 1:05. 51-31 NFC

Starting Lineups
Starting Lineups as voted on by NFL players and coaches

AFC roster

Offense

Defense

Special teams

NFC roster

Offense

Defense

Special teams

Notes:
Replacement selection due to injury or vacancy
Injured player; selected but did not play
Replacement starter; selected as reserve

2000 Pro Bowl Cheerleading Squad

Katie Currier, Arizona Cardinals
Jillian Edwards, Atlanta Falcons
Meah Pace, Baltimore Ravens
Julie F, Buffalo Bills
Nicole Price, Carolina Panthers
Nikki Lanzetta, Cincinnati Bengals
Megan Willsey, Dallas Cowboys
Marie Nesbitt, Denver Broncos
Carrie Vogel, Indianapolis Colts
Stephanie Archibald, Jacksonville Jaguars
Rosie Hannan, Kansas City Chiefs
Suzanne Bierwith, Miami Dolphins
Angela Parkos, Minnesota Vikings
Kalen Mace, New England Patriots
Lani Quagliano, New Orleans Saints
Patty Herrera, Oakland Raiders
Cheryl Williams, Philadelphia Eagles
Michelle Steptoe, St. Louis Rams
Susan Macy, San Diego Chargers
Antoinette Bertolani, San Francisco 49ers
Angela Adto, Seattle Seahawks
Kristin Turner, Tampa Bay Buccaneers

Number of selections per team

References

External links
2000 Pro Bowl recap on ProBowlOnline.com

Pro Bowl
Pro Bowl
Pro Bowl
Pro Bowl
Pro Bowl
American football competitions in Honolulu
February 2000 sports events in the United States